Gulom Urunov (born 7 June 1989) is an Uzbek professional footballer who last played as a defender for Indian I-League side Gokulam Kerala.

Club career

Gokulam Kerala
After playing his entire career in his native Uzbekistan, Urunov moved to India to sign with I-League side Gokulam Kerala. He made his debut for the club on 9 December 2017 against NEROCA. He started and played just the first half before being subbed off as Gokulam Kerala were defeated 0–3.

References

External links
Profile on Soccerway

1989 births
Living people
Uzbekistani footballers
Association football defenders
PFC Lokomotiv Tashkent players
FC Qizilqum Zarafshon players
FK Neftchi Farg'ona players
FK Dinamo Samarqand players
FC AGMK players
FK Andijon players
FC Sogdiana Jizzakh players
FC Obod players
Gokulam Kerala FC players
Uzbekistan Super League players
I-League players
Expatriate footballers in India
Footballers at the 2010 Asian Games
Asian Games competitors for Uzbekistan